Grand Theft Parsons is a 2003 comedy-drama film based on the true story of country rock musician Gram Parsons (played by Gabriel Macht), who died of an overdose in 1973. Parsons and his road manager, Phil Kaufman (Johnny Knoxville), made a pact in life that whoever died first would be cremated by the other in what was then the Joshua Tree National Monument, an area of desert they both loved and cherished.

Plot
The death of singer Gram Parsons prompts Phil Kaufman to fulfill his promise and a black comedy unwinds, with Kaufman bribing mortuary personnel, renting a psychedelic hearse from Larry Oster-Berg, and trekking across the southern California desert, pursued all the while by Parsons' ex-girlfriend with Kaufman's girlfriend and Parsons’ stepfather.

Cast
Johnny Knoxville as Phil Kaufman
Christina Applegate as Barbara
Michael Shannon as Larry Oster-Berg
Marley Shelton as Susie
Robert Forster as Stanley Parsons
Gabriel Macht as Gram Parsons
Phil Kaufman as Handcuffed Felon

Reception
Grand Theft Parsons was shown in the "Park City at Midnight" section at the 2004 Sundance Film Festival.

The film received mixed notices from critics. In his review for The New York Times, A. O. Scott wrote, "Parsons himself might have written a surreal, funny-sad ballad about the aftermath of his own death, but Grand Theft Parsons is little more than a surreal anecdote, told in too much detail and without enough soul or imagination to make anything more than a footnote to a legend". Kimberley Jones, in her review for the Austin Chronicle, wrote, "Black comedy can be a beautiful thing, but Grand Theft Parsons consistently misses that mark for a more bottom-feeding tasteless and broad, with the occasional ham-handed, soulless stab at sober reflection". In his review for the Los Angeles Times, Kevin Crust found Johnny Knoxville "surprisingly good" but felt that the script left "a lot to be desired, strewn with dialogue as flat and stale as old beer and some invented characters who make the events depicted seem more silly than anarchic".

However, in his review for the Sunday Times, Bryan Appleyard wrote, "Grand Theft Parsons is a delight, a comic tragedy that, though it does not say much about Parsons's art, says a great deal about the context in which it emerged". Time Out London found that the film "hit on a pleasing vein of deadpan stoner humour, especially in the character of a hearse-driving hippie who comes along for the ride" and "could easily become a cult favourite". The Daily Mirror wrote, "It's a mark of this movie's tremendous charm that, as the flames rise towards the sky, the ending seems gloriously happy".

References

External links
Official site

2003 films
2003 comedy-drama films
2003 independent films
American comedy-drama films
British comedy-drama films
2000s English-language films
2000s American films
2000s British films